Abbot is a small lunar impact crater that lies on the rugged ground between the Mare Fecunditatis in the south and west, and the Mare Crisium to the north. It is a circular crater with a cup-shaped interior. The inner walls slope downward to the midpoint, and no impacts of significant mark the interior or the rim.

Abbot is named after the American astrophysicist Charles Greeley Abbot. It was designated Apollonius K before being given its name by the IAU. Apollonius itself lies to the east of the crater Abbot.

References

External links

 LTO-62D1 Abbot — L&PI topographic map

Impact craters on the Moon